The Pacific International Children's Choir Festival (PICCFEST) was established in 1998 as a week-long residential event and quickly became regarded as one of the top treble choir festivals in North America. The festival's co-founder and Artistic Director is Peter Robb, a composer and arranger of choral music as well as a conductor.  The other co-founders are Genevieve Robb and Rebecca Robb Hicks. The gathering takes place each year in Eugene, Oregon, United States, in conjunction with the long-established Oregon Bach Festival.

In 2015 the name was changed to Pacific International Choral Festivals (picfest) in order to better identify the expansion from one festival to two festivals each season. With the slogan Longer season, shorter name, picfest announced a line-up of four distinct events. On even numbered years, the June event is now Youth Choral Festival (open to all voicings of young choirs up through age 18) and the new July event is the Young Women's Choral Festival (for female singers through age 18). On odd numbered years, picfest features the Treble Choral Festival in June and the newly renamed Sing Brothers Sing! Choral Festival in July (for male singers up through age 18).

picfest is built on a non-competitive model. Each year ten -sixteen choirs are admitted through an audition process that takes into account the choir's history, repertoire, and recordings. Since inception, more than 180 choirs from 38 states and provinces in the United States, Canada, Australia, Finland, Taiwan and the Philippines have been selected and participated.

Choirs and their chaperones are housed on the beautiful University of Oregon campus.

The collaboration between picfest and the Oregon Bach Festival usually results in a performance by the picfest Chorus at the opening ceremonies of the Oregon Bach Festival. In 2008, with the U.S. Olympic Track & Field Trials running concurrently with the festivals, the opening ceremonies performance took place on the performance venue at track's legendary Hayward Field. In 2011 and 2017, the Oregon Bach Festival had no official opening ceremony, and the entire picfest Chorus performed a free On-The-House concert.

picfest presents one of the Oregon Bach Festival's On-The-House concerts in the Hult Center lobby during each festival. This concert features one or two of the visiting choirs or the entire festival chorus, as in 2011 and 2017. Attending choirs also perform individually at various local churches on the Sunday of the June Festival. Each festival concludes with a ticketed concert -  the Gala Concert in June and the Finale Concert in July - performed by the Festival Chorus and guest musicians.

Conductors  and themes
Each year picfest features a guest conductor of international stature. Recent guest conductors have included Susan Brumfiel (2019), Sandra Snow (2003, 2007, 2009, 2011, 2015), Bob Chilcott (2005, 2008, 2012, 2014, 2016, 2018), Lynne Gackle (2010), Andrea Ramsey (2014, 2016) and Henry Leck (2001, 2006, 2013, 2017).

Beginning in 2014, the season expanded to two festivals each summer. On even numbered years: Youth Choral Festival and Young Women's Choral Festival;  and on odd numbered years: Treble Choral Festival and Boys & Young Men's Choral Festival. Scheduled for 2019 are Susan Brumfield (Treble Choral Festival) and Fernando Malvar-Ruiz (Sing Brothers Sing! Choral Festival). The 2020 season features Bob Chilcott (Youth Choral Festival) and Andrea Ramsey/Sandra Snow (Young Women's Choral Festival). 

The repertoire of the festival chorus reflects a theme selected for each year, except for 2010 and 2012, which didn't have official themes:
1998 - Our Voices Raised in Song
1999 - Color the World with a Song
2000 - Listen to the Future
2001 - Roads to the Heart
2002 - The World is Full of Poetry
2003 - Dreams of Peace
2004 - Imagine
2005 - Walk • Dance • Talk • Sing
2006 - Untraveled Worlds
2007 - Celebrate! The Tenth Anniversary
2008 - I Dream A World
2009 - Rediscovering the Americas: The Music of Two Continents
2010 - Gala Concert
2011 - Wild About Singing
2012 - A Magical Musical Land Called PICCFEST
2013 - Heartsongs
2014 - Turn The World Around (Youth Choral Festival) and Voices Strong & Beautiful (Young Women's Choral Festival)
2015 - East Meets West (Treble Choral Festival) and North Meets South (Boys & Young Men's Choral Festival)
2016 - Shakespeare & All That Jazz (Youth Choral Festival) and The Poet Sings (Young Women's Choral Festival)
2017 - Alway Something Sings (Treble Choral Festival) and True Colors (Boys & Young Men's Choral Festival)
2018 - In the Heart of the World (Youth Choral Festival)
2019 - Turn the Music Up! (Treble Choral Festival)

References

External links 
Official website

Choral festivals